The Microleve ML 500 is a Brazilian ultralight aircraft that was designed by Swiss engineer Hans Gygax and produced by Microleve of Rio de Janeiro. The aircraft was supplied as a kit for amateur construction or as a complete ready-to-fly-aircraft.

The company appears to be out of business and the aircraft no longer available.

Design and development
The ML 500 complies with the Fédération Aéronautique Internationale microlight rules. It features a strut-braced parasol wing, a two-seats-in-side-by-side configuration enclosed cockpit, fixed tricycle landing gear and a single engine in pusher configuration.

The aircraft is made from bolted-together aluminum tubing, with its flying surfaces covered in Dacron sailcloth and the cockpit enclosure is built from fibreglass. The tail is mounted to a small diameter aluminium tube. The standard engine available was the  Rotax 582 two-stroke powerplant, mounted on the wing trailing edge. The landing gear can be equipped with optional wheel pants.

Specifications (ML 500)

References

External links
Microleve website archives on Archive.org

ML 500
1990s Brazilian ultralight aircraft
Homebuilt aircraft
Single-engined pusher aircraft